Charles Aiken may refer to:

 Charles Augustus Aiken (1827–1892), clergyman and academic
 Charles Avery Aiken (1872–1965), American painter and watercolorist